Santini is an Italian surname. Notable people with the surname include:

 André Santini (born 1940), French politician
 Bob Santini (born 1932), American former professional basketball player
 Brandon Santini (born 1982), American blues harmonica player, singer and songwriter
 Chay Santini, Puerto Rican fashion model and actress
 Claudio Santini (born 1992), Italian football player
 Dalmazio Santini (1923 - 2001), Italian-born U.S. composer
 Daniele Santini (born 1992), Italian sprint canoeist.
 Didier Santini (born 1968), retired French professional football player
 Edna Santini (born 1992), Brazilian rugby sevens player
 Fortunato Santini (1777-1861),  Italian priest, composer and music collector
 Gabriel Santini (born 2000), Italian footballer
 Gabriele Santini (1886-1964), Italian conductor
 Giovanni Sante Gaspero Santini (1787-1877), Italian astronomer and mathematician
 Graziella Santini (born 1960), Sammarinese athlete
 Giuseppe Santini (1735-1796), Italian abbot and a mathematician
 Inti Muñoz Santini (born 1974), Mexican politician 
 Ivan Santini (born 1989), Croatian footballer
 Jacques Santini, French footballer
 James David Santini (1937-2015), United States Representative from Nevada
 Jan Santini Aichel (1677-1723), Czech baroque architect of Italian descent
 Jorge Santini, Puerto Rican politician, former mayor of San Juan
 Krševan Santini (born 1987), Croatian football goalkeeper
 Nadia Santini, Italian chef
 Nilmaris Santini (1959-2006), Puerto Rican female judoka
 Norma Santini (born 1932), Venezuelan fencer
 Rinaldo Santini (1914-2013), Italian Christian Democrat politician
 Ruggiero Santini (1870-1958), Italian general
 Steven Santini (born 1995), American ice hockey defenseman
 Seven Santini Brothers, founders of the eponymous moving and storage company
 Wellentony Tafua Santini (born 1993), Australian rugby league footballer

Fictional characters
 Dominic Santini, a character in the television series Airwolf
 Carla Santini, a character in the film/book Confessions of a Teenage Drama Queen

See also
 37699 Santini-Aichl, a minor planet discovered 
 4158 Santini, a minor planet 
 Santini SMS, Italian cycling clothes brand
 Santini-Conti, professional continental cycling team registered in Italy
 Seven Santini Brothers, full-service American moving, storage, and relocation company
 The Great Santini (novel), written by Pat Conroy and published in 1976
 Santino, a male given name
 Santos (disambiguation)
 Satini, a given name and surname

Italian-language surnames